The Warrens of Virginia is a 1915 American drama film directed by Cecil B. DeMille. Prints of the film survive at the George Eastman House Motion Picture Collection.

Plot
As the American Civil War begins, Ned Burton leaves his Southern love, Agatha Warren, and joins the Union army. He is later protected and saved from death by Agatha in spite of her loyalty to the South.

Cast
 Blanche Sweet as Agatha Warren
 James Neill as General Warren
 Page Peters as Arthur Warren (as P.E. Peters)
 Mabel Van Buren as Mrs. Warren
 House Peters as Ned Burton
 Dick La Reno as General Griffin
 Mildred Harris as Betty Warren
 Milton Brown as Zeke Biggs
 Sydney Deane as General Harding
 Raymond Hatton as Blake
 DeWitt Jennings
 Richard L'Estrange as Bill Peavey (credited as Dick La Strange)
 Lucien Littlefield as Tom Dabney

See also
Blanche Sweet filmography
The Warrens of Virginia (1924 film)

References

External links

1915 films
1915 drama films
1910s war drama films
American war drama films
American silent feature films
American black-and-white films
American Civil War films
Films directed by Cecil B. DeMille
Films set in Virginia
American films based on plays
1910s American films
Silent American drama films
Silent war drama films
1910s English-language films